Route 172 is an east/west highway on the north shore of the St. Lawrence River in Quebec, Canada, and it parallels the Saguenay River on the north side of it. The western terminus of Route 172 is in Saint-Nazaire at the junction of Route 169, and the eastern terminus is in Tadoussac, at the junction of Route 138.

Municipalities along Route 172

 Saint-Nazaire du Lac-Saint-Jean
 Shipshaw
 Saguenay (Chicoutimi)
 Saint-Fulgence
 Sainte-Rose-du-Nord
 Sacre-Coeur-Saguenay
 Tadoussac

See also
 List of Quebec provincial highways

References

External links 
 Provincial Route Map (Courtesy of the Quebec Ministry of Transportation) 

172
Roads in Saguenay–Lac-Saint-Jean
Transport in Saguenay, Quebec